The Chechen–Kazikumukh war, also known as  Chechen reconquista or Z'okk-K'ant's campaign against the Kazikumukh's was a war between Chechens and the Kumyks of Gazikumukh Shamkhalate, the Kabardians and the Kalmyks in the 16th century. The war began as a result of Chechens from Nashkh region resettling around the Kazikumukh controlled area of T'sontaroy (modern day Grozny) and refusing to pay tribute to the Kazikumukhs. The war lasted 10 years, defeating the Kazikumukh in 3 years, and conflict with the Kalmyks and Karbardians continued for 6 more years both ending in a Chechen victory with the Chechens reconquering former lands of Aukh and Nokhchmokhk, continuing until the shoreline of the Caspian Sea and pushing the Kalmyks beyond the Terek (river). The Kazikumukh worrying that the Chechens will continue to conquer more lands sent a messenger to Sulak (river) in order to reach an agreement with the Chechens, as a result the Chir-yurt peace treaty was signed and one of the Shamkals sons was given to the Chechens as an amanat (hostage).



Prelude 
In the second quarter of the 16th century, "ShalgIu-shah Taymaskha" (Shah of Iran Tahmasp I) brought down his armies on the mountains of the South Caucasus, provoking the movement of the masses to the north. In the hands of Mekhk-Khel, a demographic resource was concentrated, which was used to recapture the previously occupied eastern and flat lands of the Chechens from their enemy. In 1541, Mehk-Khel, identified the repatriates and authorized Zokk to lead the resettlement of a group of migrants from Nashkhi to Nokhchmokhk. Apparently, it was an advanced detachment and reconnaissance operation. The movement to Nokhchmokhk went through the Argun gorge up the Sharo-Argun to Cheberloy, and from there to the sources of Iasi. During the period under review, in Tsontaroy (then the administrative center of Nokhchmokhk) there was a residence of a protege of Persian vassals, the Kazikumukh shamkhal; the representative of the shamkhal was called the term "BiotIa" (hereinafter - Bota). Residents of the region paid a symbolic tax in favor of the shamkhal - one ram out of a hundred (although even zakat - a mandatory tax for Muslims - provides for the payment of one ram out of forty; i.e. the tax was 2.5 times less than the minimum taxation in Muslim world and had, of course, a symbolic character). Zokk, at the head of settlers from Nashkhi, arrived in the regional center of Nokhch-mokhk - Tsontaroy. When the time came to pay tribute, the repatriates refused to fulfill their tax obligations, for which the foremen of the regional center, under pressure from the governor of Shamkhal, delivered an ultimatum to the Zokki group: to accept the demands of the Kazikumukh people or to retire to the area between the Gansol and Gums rivers, where there were scares and poor pastures and drinking - howling water of the earth. Repatriates from Nashkh left the center and settled in farms in interfluve. Zokk himself, apparently, settled in the fortification at the top of Tielip-gala.

Battle

Yassin campaign 
After some time, Zokk organized a military campaign against the Aksay settlements of the Kazikumukhs, defeated the local detachments and drove the colonists to the right bank of the Yassa. Apparently, this event happened after a secret agreement between Zokk and a part of the Tson-taroy seniority, who turned against the shamkhal and his governor, turned to the leader of the settlers. The news of the Yassin campaign of repatriates from Nashkhi led by Zokka reached Kazi-Kumukh.

Battle of Gums-Gansoli 
Shamkhal sent an army to the shores of Gums; in addition, he conveyed a message to Botha demanding that the local Chechens be mobilized and join the Kazikumukh forces. Shamkhal also invited Kalmyks and Kabardians, who had accepted this offer. Zokka was supported by the Chechens Gumsa and Gansoli. Opponents met, and a battle took place at Gums-Gansoli, as a result of which Zokk and his comrades were defeated by the Kazikumukh coalition. Zokka's reconnaissance mission has been completed. Mehk-Khel, having received an idea of the situation in the area, promoted Zokku from the post of military leader (bach-cha) to the status of chief commander and strategist (Tur-Da) and instructed the new commander-in-chief to assemble the people's militia to liberate the district. Preparations for the campaign stretched out for several years.

Eastern campaign (1545-1546) 
In 1545, having completed all the work, Zokk, at the head of the Chechen people's militia, went on the Eastern campaign (1545–1546), arrived in Nokhchmokhk and immediately approached the regional center, demanding that the local seniority submit to Mekhk-Khel and join to the popular movement, promising to forgive the elders for participating in the battle of Gums-Gansoli. Botha, knowingly sending a message to Shamkhal about the movement of Chechens from Nash-khi to Tsontaroy with a request to send help, met the Chechen Tur-Da in order to fight him personally. In a duel, Zokk cut off Bothe's head and sent it to the foremen of the district. The regional council of Nokhchmokhk gave way to Zokke and joined the militia forces. By that time, the Shamkhal's army approached Tsontaroy. “Within two days,” the manuscript “BIotIa Vohor” says, “the battles that began near the border of Tsontaroy were transferred to the shores of Sulak (that is, the Chechens pushed the enemy from Yassy to GIoy-khi. - Z.T.). Then the shamkhal sent messengers with a letter affixed with his seal, declaring that [he] was ready to appoint Bota (that is, a protege-viceroy. - Z.T.) from their own number Nadchechens, the chechens sent in response the corpses of the Kazikumukhs killed by them, saying that they appointed one of them as the Kazikumukh shamkhal. Enraged by this answer, the shamkhal sent messengers to the Kabardians and Kalmyks, again inviting them to rob the Chechens. The murzas and taishas of the nomads, avid for trophies, again accepted the offer of the shamkhal. The combined forces of the enemy forced the Chechens from the Sulak to the upper reaches of the Yassa and the foot of the Benoy. Zokka's militia was in a difficult position. Word of what was happening reached Mehk-Khel. In Greater Nashkh, additional forces were immediately assembled and headed for Benoy. In addition, the Kakhetian king Levan, who was also at war with Kazi-Kumukh, sent to help Zokka, who was defending in Benoy, Chechens from among the soldiers who were in his military service - detachments of "keys" (led by Yanbek) and " Pkhoitsev” (under the leadership of Ushurma Okotsky). Reinforcing his army with the above detachments, Zokk resumed the offensive and again began to oust the anti-Chechen coalition of Shamkhal, first from the upper reaches of the Yassy, and then from the upper reaches of the Sulak. With fighting, the Chechens came out flat, liberated Nokhchmokhk, Aukh and approached the shores of the Caspian Sea.

Aftermath

Chir-yurt peace treaty 
The manuscript further states: “[Then] the shamkhal sent people beyond Sulak [in order to reach] an agreement, [assuming obligations] not to challenge the area beyond Sulak from the sources of the rivers to the coastal [region] Ishlandash” (swamps and swamps of the Caspian lowland at the mouths of the rivers. - Z.T.), if the Chechens stop further [movement deep into Shamkhalism], and [in confirmation of] the reliability of [this oath] send their son along with his family to Tsontara "vekal-vakha" (i.e., ambassador-amanat, or a hostage. - Z.T.)". Thus, the shamkhal agreed to give one of his sons, who did not claim the throne, as an amanat in order to achieve peace and as a confirmation of his sincerity. The Chechen side, making sure that the Nogai Tumens living in the Ishlandash area would take an oath of allegiance and would not interfere with the new (Chechen) authorities, accepted the Shamkhal's proposal and later approved the Chir-yurt peace treaty (1548) with Kazikumukh shamkhal-stvo. At the same time, the son of Shamkhal, apparently, was settled in the area of Chanakha near Tsontaroy. After the victory over the shamkhal, Zokk erected a religious building in the Yarditye area. “Going on a campaign or [on other business],” the GIela manuscript reports, “[Zokk] came to Yardita, praying [to God] for the success [of the enterprise].” Also, a large and unhindered resettlement of Chechens from Nashkh to the Chechen plain, to Nokhchmokhk and further to Aukh (where Shircha-Yurt was restored in 1546) began.

Battle of Old Aksai 
However, the peace with Kazi-Kumukh did not affect the Kalmyks and Kabardians, the war with which continued. At the same time, the reference point of Nokhchmokhka on the plane in the considered Old Aksai (the pre-Kumyk name is Bilitli, or Bilta) became the period under consideration. Zokka's personal patrimony was located in the area of Zokkane, and his headquarters was moved to the boundaries of the modern Nozhai-Yurtovsky district. Here, along the riverbeds of the Yassa and Bulk, there were still farmsteads settled by the Shamkhal colonists. In order to abolish foreign enclaves within the borders of the country, Zokk ordered these colonists to move to Chechen villages or retire to Shamkhalate. In addition, in order to centralize management, Zokk enlarged the rapidly emerging numerous Chechen farms and estates of Nokhchmokhka (more than a hundred) into 14–15 united villages. Due to the ongoing conflict with the nomads, Zokk reorganized the Nokhchmokhk district into a military district, introduced a tax system, and also seized the horses of citizens for the needs of the army, creating mobile cavalry units from them, leaving the population with only cattle (oxen) as transport ; finally, Mehk-Da introduced compulsory military service in the region. After an ultimatum was issued to resettle or join other Chechen auls, Zokka had a conflict with the owner of one of the three Kazikumukh villages located within the modern Nozhai-Yurtovsky district. In a duel, Zokk killed the disobedient ruler, and his wards, having decided to stay in Nokhchmokhk, joined the Chechens. Meanwhile, one of the family members of the murdered Kazikumukh ruler secretly went up to the upper reaches of the Yassa and poisoned its waters (made them unbearably bitter with the poison “tsalgan dIovsh”), provoking thirst and subsequent death of livestock. Zokk, having found out the reason for what was happening, moved the remaining livestock to the northwest to the Gums River, and the culprit of the incident was killed by his own tribesmen, who, like the rest of the inhabitants of Nokhchmokhk, were victims of the crime he had committed. Hunger riots began among the people.

First Kalmyk raid 
Seeing no other possibilities, except for a major campaign, Zokk-Kant organized the 1st Kalmyk raid on the plane in order to obtain prey and end hunger in the region. The assembled militia, to which the Kazikumukhs who submitted to the Chechen authorities voluntarily joined, raided the northern nomads, took possession of the rich booty and appeared in Benoy “with herds of horses, [a large number] of cows and flocks of sheep.” “Some part [of the booty immediately] was distributed to people; the rest,” the manuscript says, “were left to look after at Benoy.” Thus, thanks to quick and decisive action, Zokku managed to avoid the consequences of famine and popular unrest.

Kalmyk invasion of Chechnya 
In the early spring of the following year, Kalmyk taishas set off for the Ter-Sulak interfluve in order to take revenge on the Chechens. The news of the appearance of the Kalmyks in the lower reaches of the Yassa (which then flowed into the Caspian) reached Zokka, who, together with his comrades, acting in advance, went to meet them. Two troops clashed in the lower reaches of the Yassy: from here the Chechens drove the Kalmyks beyond the Terek and further into the steppe. Continuing their success, Zokk with the militia again invaded the Kalmyk possessions, and then returned to Nokhchmokhk, capturing the enemy's cattle. The listed events refer to 1548–1555. Thus, the successes of the Chechens during the military-political activity of Zokk-Kant contributed to the restoration of their sovereignty over the territories of the Chechen Plain, Nokhchmokhk, Aukh and the Caspian lands. Sokk-Kant became the debutant of the first stage of the "reconquista", i.e. the reconquest of lands, marking the beginning of a socio-political revival or the Chechen Renaissance. By the end of his life, Zokka, according to oral sources, had 12 sons, the most famous of whom was Mamm Zokkov, one of the military

References

Wars involving Chechnya